"Friends" is a song by Danish singer-songwriter Aura Dione from her second studio album, Before the Dinosaurs. The song features American production team Rock Mafia who co-wrote the song with Dione and David Jost. Dione wrote the song to let her friends know how precious they are to her. "Friends" was released as the album's second single on 2 March 2012. It became Dione's third top ten hit in her native Denmark, where it peaked at number six. "Friends" also became a top ten hit in Germany, Switzerland and Austria.

Chart performance 
The song debuted at number twenty-five on 17 February 2012 in Denmark. The following week the song rose to number twelve. In its third week on the chart the song peaked at number six, becoming Dione's third top 10 single. The song has since been certified gold by IFPI Denmark for sales of 15,000 digital copies. In Switzerland, "Friends" debuted at number sixty-four on the chart issue dated 26 February 2012. In its fourth week on the chart, the song peaked at number ten on 18 March 2012. The song has since been certified gold by International Federation of the Phonographic Industry (IFPI) for shipments of 15,000 copies in Switzerland. "Friends" debuted at number thirteen in Austria on the chart dated 9 March 2012. The following week it peaked at number three. The song debuted at number five in Germany, becoming Dione's third top 10 hit. On the chart issue dated 25 May 2012 the song hit number 1 on Polish Airplay Top 5.

Live performances 
Aura Dione performed "Friends" on 30 November 2011 on German television show The Dome along with "Geronimo". On 14 February 2012 Aura performed the song in Moscow, Russia on Big Love Show. On 18 February 2012 she performed the song for the first time on Danish television in the singing competition Voice – The Biggest Voice of Denmark together with the eight semi-finalists.

Track listing 
CD single
"Friends" (Rock Mafia & David Jost Radio Mix)
"Friends"

Digital download
"Friends" (Rock Mafia & David Jost Radio Mix) – 4:00
"Friends" – 3:42
"Friends" (Van Beil Remix) – 4:59
"Friends" (Banks & Rawdriguez Drumstep Remix) – 3:40
"Friends" (Banks & Rawdriguez Moombathon Remix) – 3:18
"Friends" (Bodybangers Remix) – 5:22

Credits and personnel 
Aura Dione – songwriter
Antonina Armato – songwriter, producer, vocal recording
Tim James – songwriter, producer, vocal recording, mixing
David Jost – songwriter, producer, vocal recording
Steve Hammons – engineer
Adam Comstock – engineer
Paul Palmer – mixing
Devrim Karaoğlu – programming
Sean Hurley – bass
Rami Jaffee – keyboards
David Davidson – string arrangement, violin
David Angel – violin
Kristin Wilkinson – viola
John Catchings – cello
Kai Blankenberg – mastering

Credits adapted from Before the Dinosaurs liner notes.

Charts and certifications

Weekly charts

Year-end charts

Certifications

Release history

References

2012 singles
Aura Dione songs
Songs written by Antonina Armato
Songs written by Tim James (musician)
Number-one singles in Poland
Music videos directed by Ray Kay
Songs written by David Jost
Songs written by Aura Dione
2010 songs
Island Records singles
Universal Music Group singles
Song recordings produced by Rock Mafia